Me is the autobiography of the English singer, pianist and composer Elton John. It was released on 15 October 2019 by Macmillan Publishers. It was ghostwritten by journalist Alexis Petridis, who worked on the book with John for three and a half years.

Overview 
The book recounts events from John's childhood in Pinner through to his final tour, Farewell Yellow Brick Road. He describes his depression and suicide attempts as well as drug addiction and his prostate cancer diagnosis. He admits he spent his whole career "trying to show my father what I'm made of". He explains the reasons behind his advocacy against AIDS.

Comments on Michael Jackson 
In the book, despite being good friends with him, John said that the American singer-songwriter Michael Jackson was "genuinely mentally ill" and "disturbing to be around". The comments arose from a lunch John hosted to introduce his husband David Furnish to Jackson in 1993.

Publication 
Me was released by Macmillan Publishers on 15 October 2019. Excerpts read by Taron Egerton (who portrayed John in the biographical film Rocketman) aired on BBC Radio 4's Book of the Week in the first week of its release.

Reception 
Hadley Freeman, a writer for The Guardian, called the book "racy, pacy and crammed with scurrilous anecdotes", saying: "Elton makes fun of no one more than himself. He is utterly, astonishingly, hilariously self-lacerating."

Variety dubbed the book "deeply dishy".

A Time review said: "Like John’s songs, Me overflows with whimsical characters, twisted humor, winking self-aggrandizement and stark pathos. True to his spirit, it's a little silly and over the top, but it's also an absorbing and unfettered joy."

In The Daily Telegraph, Neil McCormick said: "If you are in the market for an autobiography crammed with sex, drugs and rock and roll, Elton is clearly your man."

In The Times, Will Hodgkinson said that John's "sad, funny memoir reveals the insecurities that drive his needy behaviour."

References 

2019 non-fiction books
Elton John
British autobiographies
Music autobiographies
Macmillan Publishers books